"Head Shoulders Knees & Toes" is a song by French DJ duo Ofenbach and German DJ duo Quarterhead featuring vocals by American singer Norma Jean Martine. It was released through Ofenbach Music, Spinnin' Records, and Warner Music on 8 May 2020.

Composition
The song was described as "an unapologetically dancy anthem" while Martine's "raw, scorched soul vocals open the track before an upbeat kick chimes in". Lyrically, the song is about "the feeling of being in love from head to toe" and is reminiscent of the children's song with the same name.

Music video
The accompanying music video was released on 7 August 2020 was directed by Antoine Casanova. The clip features a nostalgic VHS-tinged filter.

Charts

Weekly charts

Year-end charts

Certifications

See also
List of Airplay 100 number ones of the 2020s

References

2020 songs
2020 singles
Number-one singles in Poland
Number-one singles in Romania
Ofenbach (DJs) songs